Qubba Sittna Zaynab is a mosque and mausoleum located in Sinjar, in the Ninawa Governorate. The original mausoleum building was built in 1239 CE by Badr al-Din Lu'lu' as part of a ruling strategy to promote Shia Islam by sponsoring the erection of shrines and tombs dedicated to Imams throughout the Ninawa Governorate.

History 
The original mausoleum dated back to 1239 CE. It was built over a tomb believed to be that of Sayyidah Zaynab, the daughter of the fourth Shia Imam, Ali ibn Husayn Zayn Al-Abidin, also known as Imam al-Sajjad.

The building was severely destroyed by the 13th century Mongol Invasion but was restored by the Muslim Mongol ruler Kowam al-Din ibn Muhammad al-Yazidi for the Friday prayers. In 1693 the Pasha ben Khada renovated the place completely.

Construction

Before demolition (12th century - 2014)
The main part of the mausoleum, the shrine and tomb of Zaynab, is a large chamber topped with a conical ribbed dome. The dome's structure is similar the dome seen on the Mashhad Imam Awn Al-Din in Mosul. The tomb itself is a stone sarcophagus with Quranic inscriptions on it.

Next to Sayyidah Zaynab's mausoleum is a musalla. It is topped by a ribbed circular dome and contains a mihrab made out of gypsum. The mihrab occupies the entire Qibla wall. Other rooms have been added to the building but do not feature any decorations.

2019 reconstruction
When the shrine was rebuilt in 2019, it differed greatly from the original structure. Instead of a conical ribbed circular dome, a golden dome topped the tomb chamber. A zarih was constructed around the sarcophagus as well.

2014 demolition 
The mosque and shrine of Sayyida Zaynab were demolished using explosive devices by the Islamic State of Iraq and the Levant in 2014.

2019 reconstruction 
The ruined shrine was reconstructed in 2019 by the Imam Ali Brigades, an Iran-backed paramilitary group. The new building sports a golden dome with a mirrored ceiling, granite columns and marble floor.

See also 

 List of mosques in Iraq

References 

Mosques in Iraq